Live on Lansdowne, Boston MA is the second live album and the third live DVD by the celtic punk band, Dropkick Murphys. It was recorded at seven shows over the span of six nights of their annual St Patrick's Day weekend shows in Boston, Massachusetts. The album has an entirely different track list to the previous live album, Live on St. Patrick's Day From Boston, MA, apart from ″Forever 2009″, a new version of "Forever".

Track list

Chart performance

References

2010 live albums
Dropkick Murphys albums
2010 video albums
Live video albums